CBCV-FM is a Canadian radio station, which broadcasts the programming of the CBC Radio One network in Victoria, British Columbia, and throughout Vancouver Island, the Southern Gulf Islands, and the Sunshine Coast. It also reaches out to parts of Washington north of Everett, but is harder to listen to because of KSER on 90.7.

It was the most listened to radio station in the Victoria Market in the Fall 2018 Numeris Diary Survey.

History
The station was licensed by the CRTC in 1997, and was launched on September 28, 1998. At the same time, the station was licensed to add a rebroadcaster at Metchosin, and took over 13 existing rebroadcasters of Vancouver's CBU.
Prior to the station's launch, Victoria was the only provincial capital in Canada without its own CBC Radio production centre.

As of January 25, 2013, the station shares its studio facilities with independent television station CHEK-DT.

Local programming
The station's local programs are On the Island (hosted by Gregor Craigie) in the morning and All Points West (hosted by Robyn Burns) in the afternoon. Both programs broadcast exclusively on CBCV and its rebroadcasters on Vancouver Island and the Sunshine Coast.

Transmitters

The only major city on Vancouver Island without its own CBC Radio transmitter is Nanaimo. CBCV's signal on 90.5 MHz from Victoria only reaches as far north as Ladysmith, and its signal on 92.5 MHz from Powell River as received in the Nanaimo area interferes with KQMV from Seattle. Consequently, the only CBC Radio One signals that can be reliably received in the Nanaimo area are from CBU Vancouver, which air weekday morning and afternoon local programs from Vancouver instead of Victoria. The CBC applied to the CRTC to add a rebroadcaster of CBCV at Nanaimo in 2007, contemporaneous with an application to convert the Vancouver station to FM. As few FM frequencies remain available in the Vancouver-Victoria market, however, the applications were denied. CBU was permitted to add a nested low-power rebroadcaster in the urban core of Vancouver, but was required to maintain the AM signal to serve outlying areas, including Nanaimo. HD Radio receivers in Nanaimo can however receive Victoria's local programming over the HD3 channel of Vancouver's 88.1 MHz signal.

On October 20, 2015 the CRTC approved the CBC's application to operate a low-power FM rebroadcasting transmitter in Ucluelet, which will operate at 92.7 MHz with an effective radiated power of 50 watts. The new FM transmitter replaced the old AM transmitter, CBXQ.

On March 9, 2016, the CBC received CRTC approval to change the technical parameters of CBRY by changing the transmitter's class from A1 to A, by increasing the effective radiated power from 77 to 360 watts and by increasing the effective height of antenna above average terrain from -50.5 to -41.5 metres.

On December 22, 2016, the CBC applied to convert CBUX 1170 to 92.3 MHz with the proposed callsign CBCV-FM-2. The CRTC approved the CBC's application on March 17, 2017.

References

External links

CBC British Columbia
 

BCV
BCV
Radio stations established in 1998
1998 establishments in British Columbia